The Men's 100 Backstroke at the 10th FINA World Swimming Championships (25m) was swum 15–16 December 2010 in Dubai, United Arab Emirates. On 15 December, 73 individuals swam in the Preliminary heats in the morning, with the top-16 finishers advancing on to the Semifinals that evening. The top-8 finishers in the Semifinals then advanced on to the Final the next evening.

Records
A the start of the event, the existing World (WR) and Championship records (CR) were:

The following records were established during the competition:

Results

Prelims

Semifinals
Semifinal 1

Semifinal 2

Final

References

Backstroke 100 metre, Men's
World Short Course Swimming Championships